Meng Fei (born January 23, 1985, in Harbin, Heilongjiang) is a Chinese former competitive ice dancer.

He teamed up with partner Guo Jiameimei in 2006. They placed 11th at the 2008 Four Continents Championships.

Before that, he competed with Wang Jiayue through 2006. They were the 2006 Chinese bronze medalist. They placed 12th at the 2005 Four Continents Championships.

Programs
(with Guo)

Competitive highlights
(with Guo)

(with Wang)

References
 
 

1985 births
Living people
Chinese male ice dancers
Figure skaters from Harbin
Competitors at the 2009 Winter Universiade